Hans Christian Poul Hansen (27 February 1913 – 13 August 1966), simply known as Poul Hansen, was a Danish politician, who served as Defence Minister of Denmark from 1956 to 1962 and Danish Minister of Finance from 1962 to 1965. He represented the Social Democrats in the Folketinget parliament for 21 years.

Born in Copenhagen, from 1937 to 1942, Hansen served as chairman of the Social Democratic Youth of Denmark, and he later worked as a journalist for a Social Democratic newspaper. In 1945, he was elected to the Danish Folketinget parliament. Hansen was named Defence Minister by Prime Minister of Denmark H. C. Hansen on 25 May 1956, replacing Rasmus Hansen. In the subsequent governments of Viggo Kampmann and Jens Otto Krag, Hansen retained this position. On 15 November 1962, Hansen moved from his position as Defence Minister to replace the recently deceased Hans R. Knudsen as Minister of Finance. As Jens Otto Krag did not have a Danish Minister of Economic Affairs ready for his newly elected government on 26 September 1964, Hansen served as interim Minister of Finance and Economic Affairs both for two weeks, until Henry Grünbaum was named permanent Minister of Economic Affairs on 8 October 1964.

Ministerial positions
Hansen was named minister in several cabinets from 1956 to 1965:
 Defence Minister in the Cabinet of H. C. Hansen I from May 25, 1956 to May 28, 1957
 Defence Minister in the Cabinet of H. C. Hansen II from May 28, 1957 to February 21, 1960
 Defence Minister in the Cabinet of Viggo Kampmann I from February 21, 1960 to November 18, 1960
 Defence Minister in the Cabinet of Viggo Kampmann II from November 18, 1960 to September 3, 1962
 Defence Minister in the Cabinet of Jens Otto Krag I from September 3, 1962 to November 15, 1962
 Minister of Finance in the Cabinet of Jens Otto Krag I from November 15, 1962 to September 26, 1964
 Minister of Finance and Economic Affairs in the Cabinet of Jens Otto Krag II from September 26, 1964 to October 8, 1964
 Minister of Finance in the Cabinet of Jens Otto Krag II from October 8, 1964 to August 25, 1965

References

1913 births
1966 deaths
Social Democrats (Denmark) politicians
Danish Defence Ministers
Danish Finance Ministers
Members of the Folketing
Politicians from Copenhagen
Place of death missing